William Wallace Davenport Turner (June 1, 1836 – April 2, 1905) was a member of the Wisconsin State Assembly.

Biography
Turner was born on June 1, 1836 in Quincy, Illinois. During the American Civil War, he served with the 20th Missouri Volunteer Infantry Regiment of the Union Army, achieving the rank of colonel. Engagements he took part in include the Siege of Vicksburg. After the war, Turner lived for a time in Mobile, Alabama before moving to Ripon, Wisconsin in 1877. He later lived in Spokane, Washington and Bozeman, Montana, where he was president of the Yellowstone Park railway. He died in Los Angeles on April 2, 1905.

Political career
Turner was a member of the Assembly in 1883. He had been City Attorney of Ripon for two terms. Additionally, Turner was City Attorney of Mobile and a candidate for the United States House of Representatives from Alabama's 1st congressional district in 1876, losing to James T. Jones. He was a Republican.

References

External links
 

People from Quincy, Illinois
Politicians from Mobile, Alabama
People from Ripon, Wisconsin
Republican Party members of the Wisconsin State Assembly
Wisconsin lawyers
Alabama lawyers
Alabama Republicans
People of Missouri in the American Civil War
People of Wisconsin in the American Civil War
Union Army colonels
1836 births
1905 deaths
Lawyers from Mobile, Alabama
19th-century American politicians
Military personnel from Illinois